Ewingar is a locality located in the Northern Rivers Region of New South Wales.

Population
In the 2016 Census, there were 67 people in Ewingar (State Suburb(SSC)). 66.2% of people were Male and 33.8% of people were Female. The median age was 58 years.

References 

Towns in New South Wales
Northern Rivers